Australian Test Team of the Century could mean:

 Australian Cricket Board Team of the Century
 Australian Rugby League's Team of the Century

See also 
 Team of the century